José Manuel Gómet Canet (born February 9, 1956) is a retired boxer from Spain. He represented his native country at the 1976 Summer Olympics in Montreal, Quebec, Canada. There, he was knocked out in first round of the light welterweight division (– 63.5 kg) division by Thailand's Narong Boonfuang.

1976 Olympic results

Below is the record of José Manuel Gómet, a Spanish light welterweight boxer who competed at the 1976 Montreal Olympics:

 Round of 64: lost to Narong Boonfuang (Thailand) by a first-round knockout

References
 Spanish Olympic Committee

1956 births
Living people
Light-welterweight boxers
Boxers at the 1976 Summer Olympics
Olympic boxers of Spain
Spanish male boxers